Justin Rice is an American musician and actor.

Music career
Since 2001, he has played guitar for indie rock band Bishop Allen.  He also co-wrote the music for the documentary The Bully Project with band-mate Christian Rudder., and the music for the independent film Mutual Friends with David Lerner.

Justin Rice formed a second band, The Last Names, in 2011 with his wife Darbie Nowatka (also from Bishop Allen); they are releasing a free cover song every week through 2012 in advance of a full-length album.

Movie career
Rice has also had roles in two Andrew Bujalski films; 2002's Funny Ha Ha and 2006's Mutual Appreciation. He also stars in the 2007 independent film Let Them Chirp Awhile, directed by Jonathan Blitstein. Rice has a role in Joe Swanberg's 2009 feature film Alexander the Last, Bob Byington independent micro-budget feature Harmony and Me (2009) and Michael Harring's The Mountain, the River and the Road.

With Randy Bell, Rice co-directed a documentary about Bob Dylan called Look Back, Don't Look Back. He is also in the 2008 film Nick and Nora's Infinite Playlist as himself. He stars also alongside Paige Stark in the Ti West web series, Dead & Lonely.

Personal life
Rice studied at Harvard University. He and Darbie Nowatka married on September 12, 2009.

References

External links

Indie folk musicians
American folk guitarists
American folk singers
Living people
Harvard University alumni
1976 births